European Alternatives (also known as EA or Euroalter) is a non-profit civil society organisation promoting democracy, equality and culture beyond the nation-state. The mission of the organisation is to promote a more democratic, equal and culturally open Europe. It does it by providing participatory spaces, helping to develop alternative means of political, social, and cultural participation and by connecting local activists and organisations spread around Europe.

Origins 
The organisation was established in London by Lorenzo Marsili and Niccolò Milanese as a nonprofit company under UK law in February 2007 and was launched with the organisation of the London Festival of Europe in March 2007, marking the 50th anniversary of the Treaties of Rome. The opening lecture was given by Polish sociologist Zygmunt Bauman and main partners included the London School of Economics, Tate Modern, and Courtauld Institute of Arts.

Today, the organisation has offices in Paris, Berlin and Rome and organises activities across the EU, Ukraine and Turkey.

Mission and values 
The organisation aims to promote the emergence of a transitional political space empowering citizens, civil society and social movements to act at European level and reclaim their democratic agency over EU policies. European Alternatives presents itself as an infrastructure empowering members, partners, and organisations across Europe to upscale and connect their work for greater influence and impact. The organisation also promotes the emergence of real transnational parties in Europe.

The organisation favours greater democratic political integration in the European Union, but is critical of the status quo, claiming that "the current European regime is undermining its own claims to universal rights, democracy and justice". Its motto is "Democracy, Equality, Culture Beyond the Nation-State”.

Structure 
The movement is overseen by a Board of Trustees and an Advisory Board.

Members of the Board of Trustees 
 Beppe Caccia
 Guilhem Delteil
 Catherine Fieschi
 Noel Hatch
 Srecko Horvat
 Alessandro Valera
 Tony Venables
 Luisa Maria Schweizer
 Sara Saleri
 Rasha Saaban
 Rui Tavares
 Daphne Büllesbach
 Lorenzo Marsili
 Ségolène Pruvot

Members of the Advisory Board 
 Ulrike Guérot
 Etienne Balibar
 Raffaella Bollini
 Tania Bruguera
 Engin Isin
 Sandro Mezzadra
 Gianluca Solera
 Igor Štiks
 Catherine de Wenden
 Sigrid Gareis

Members and network 
European Alternatives benefits from a transnational community of supporters throughout Europe. Membership is open to all who share EA's objectives and is free of charge.

Main activities

Projects

TRANSEUROPA Festival 
Transeuropa Festival was established in 2007 in London as ‘London Festival of Europe’, holding its first Transeuropa Festival in 2010. Transeuropa Festival was a transnational festival of culture, arts and politics, taking place in different cities all over Europe (initially in sync and distributed, but later centered at specific location). Director of European Alternatives invites in 2015 participation to the Belgrade event, as organization operates both inside and outside the current European Union. Through a series of linked practices, events and discourses it produces a shared and collaborative space to develop transnational projects tackling politics.

Campus of European Alternatives 
The general objectives of the Campus are to find the best paths to combat to rise of extreme right in Europe and to share and exchange practices to create transnational movements.

Citizens Rights 
The Citi-Rights project examines how, when and where people in the EU can individually and collectively protect and advance rights and, where they are limited from exercising their rights, how transnational collaboration can imagine and build a future where rights are actively protected. The project is in partnership with eleven organisations across Europe and has several components: researching citizen rights in the EU, providing trainings for civil-society activists to improve their capacity to protect and extend rights, teaching about rights in schools and universities and drafting EU policy proposals.

Civil Society Forum of the Western Balkans summit series

Talk Real 
Talk Real is a nomadic political talk show for the web and new media format piloted since Summer 2015.[16] The talkshow provides a space for discussions that explore topics in depth telling the stories of different social movements across Europe. Talk Real works as an informal audiovisual platform for the dissemination of ideas and the organisations and individuals behind them.[17]

Transnational Dialogues 
[18]

Campaigns

Media Freedom Campaign 
In 2014 European Alternatives ran a European Citizens Initiative (ECI) on media freedom, collecting 200,000 signatures across the EU to demand better European policy to protect freedom of information. The ECI is a new tool of participatory democracy introduced from April 2012 by the Lisbon Treaty, which allows civil society coalitions to collect signatures online and offline to present directly to the European Commission a proposal forming the base of an EU Directive.[19]

Charter of Lampedusa

Publications

Magazines 
 The Myth of Europa
 Transeuropa Magazine
 Transnational Dialogues Journals
 The Transeuropa Caravans

Policy recommendations 
 European Elections Guide
 State of the Media in Italy
 EU Policy pamphlets Published in 12 languages
 A State of Democracy: Towards Citizen Rights Protection
 The Citizens Manifesto for European Democracy, Solidarity and Equality
 Manifesto of the Appalled economists
 The Charter of Lampedusa

Awards and honours 
In 2008 European Alternatives won a prize from the Charlemagne Foundation and the European Parliament for the London Festival of Europe.

In 2011 European Alternatives won the civil society prize from the European Economic and Social Committee.

European Alternatives is certified the B!ngo certificate and B-Star Label by the Brussels interns’ organisation B!ingo for the quality of the internship offered (Quality Early Job Experience).

Controversy 
The organisation was attacked by the UK Daily Mail. Niccolò Milanese responded to the accusations in The Guardian.

References

External links 
 Official website

2007 establishments in the United Kingdom
International non-profit organizations
Charities based in London